There are many insects in the family Tettigoniidae (bush crickets or katydids) which are mimics of leaves.

This type of camouflage occurs in several subfamilies including the:
 Pterochrozinae
 Phaneropterinae
 Pseudophyllinae

Other unrelated insects adopting a similar camouflage strategy include the leaf insects.

Gallery

References

Tettigoniidae
Insect common names